This article displays the qualifying draw of the 2011 Swiss Indoors.

Players

Seeds

Qualifiers

Lucky losers
  Mikhail Kukushkin
  Marco Chiudinelli

Qualifying draw

First qualifier

Second qualifier

Third qualifier

Fourth qualifier

References
 Qualifying Draw

Davidoff Swiss Indoors - qualifying
2011 Davidoff Swiss Indoors
Qualification for tennis tournaments